Zak Benjamin Whitbread (born January 10, 1984) is an American-English retired professional footballer who played as a defender.

Early life
Although born in Houston, Texas, United States, Whitbread has spent most of his life in England and Singapore. He has lived in Runcorn for the majority of his life, except for the five years he spent in Singapore when his father, Barry Whitbread, was the coach of the Singapore national football team during the late 1990s. While in Singapore, Whitbread attended St Stephen's School and then United World College of South East Asia.

Club career

Liverpool
While growing up in Runcorn, Whitbread was a fan of Manchester United, but joined Liverpool's Centre of Excellence at the age of eight, and then working his way through the Academy from under-15s through under-19s before joining the reserve team in 2003.

His first match in a Liverpool jersey took place in 2003 in an exhibition match against Thailand during the club's Far East Tour. He came on to the pitch after the start of the second half, replacing Neil Mellor. Whitbread made his first team debut in the 2004–05 season, and played a number of games alongside Sami Hyypiä in Liverpool's 2005–06 UEFA Champions League qualification campaign. He spent much of the season on loan at Millwall.

Millwall
After signing for Millwall permanently on a three-year contract in June 2006, he featured frequently in the team's first eleven, starting 18 games for his new club in the 2006–07 season, before injuring himself in September 2006. The injury sidelined him for the rest of that season.

Over the course of the 2008–09 season, Whitbread made 44 appearances, including the League One play-off final at Wembley Stadium, which Millwall lost 3–2 to Scunthorpe United.

Norwich City
Whitbread signed for Norwich City on a -year contract on January 8, 2010, making his debut in the 5–0 win over Colchester United on January 16 as a substitute for Chris Martin, but featured little thereafter due to an injury. Whitbread was given squad number 6 ahead of the 2010–11 season, switching from 31. He played 3 games in pre-season 2010–11 before he sustained another injury, which ruled him out of the start of the new league season. Whitbread was expected to return to training near the time of the international break in September, however a further setback kept him out until the new Year. Whitbread returned to full training near Christmas 2010, along with Adam Drury.

He made his long-awaited return from injury in a 4–2 win over Sheffield United on December 28, 2010, coming on as an 85th-minute substitute for Anthony McNamee. He made his first start of the season in a 1–0 victory over league leaders Queens Park Rangers, helping Norwich to a first clean sheet in 10 games. Due to Leon Barnett's hamstring injury, Whitbread developed a centre back partnership with Elliott Ward. He scored his first goal for Norwich in a 1–1 draw against Hull City at the KC Stadium on March 19, 2011.

Whitbread started in the Canaries' first game back in the Premier League, partnering Ritchie De Laet in a 1–1 draw at Wigan Athletic. However he picked up a knee injury in this match, meaning he was ruled out for the following match against Stoke City. He returned for the League Cup match against MK Dons, and started against Chelsea, but was withdrawn after 30 minutes with a suspected hamstring injury. Whitbread returned to training in November. He and Daniel Ayala got through a practice match, improving their fitness. Whitbread was back in the squad in early December.

He made a return to the Norwich squad on December 3 against Manchester City, featuring as an unused substitute. In the next fixture against Newcastle United, Whitbread was given a start in a 4–2 win for Norwich, playing well apart from giving the ball away for Demba Ba's second goal. Whitbread kept his place for the following matches, performing admirably with Russell Martin in defence. He was partnered with Daniel Ayala from the New Year's Eve fixture against Fulham, and this partnership has seen Norwich win two consecutive away matches and three wins out of three in 2012. Whitbread was withdrawn early in the 2–0 victory over Bolton Wanderers, along with Daniel Ayala after complaining of a tight hamstring, 20 minutes after Ayala was subbed due to a suspect hamstring tear. He immediately regained his place upon his return to fitness, again at the expense of Leon Barnett in the narrow 2–1 defeat to Manchester United. He suffered a minor calf injury, before the 2–2 draw against Everton, causing manager Paul Lambert to withdraw him from the squad. He was eventually released by the club at the conclusion of the season.

Leicester City
On July 24, 2012, Whitbread signed a two-year contract with Championship side Leicester City on a free transfer following the end of his contract at Norwich. He made his debut on August 28, 2012, against Burton Albion in the League Cup. Whitbread scored his first goal for Leicester City, from a Martyn Waghorn corner, during a 4–1 win against local rivals Derby County on December 1, 2012. After which he was named in the Championship Team of the Week. He was released by Leicester on May 9, 2014.

Derby County
On September 29, 2013, Derby County announced that Whitbread had signed on a three-month loan deal. He scored on his debut in a 4–4 draw at home to Ipswich Town.

At the end of the 2013–14 season, Whitbread was released by Leicester City. On June 25, 2014, Whitbread agreed a one-year deal to join Derby County on a permanent basis.

Shrewsbury Town
Following his release from Derby, Whitbread joined Shrewsbury Town in League One in October 2015, despite considering a move to the United States. Initially signing a short-term contract running until January 2016, he made his Shrewsbury debut in an unfamiliar midfield role, coming on as a substitute in a 2−1 away defeat at Scunthorpe United. A week later, he made his first start for the club, playing the full ninety minutes of a 2−0 home win over Bury. His contract was later extended to the end of the season, when he was subsequently released.

International career
Whitbread's first opportunity to play for the national team of his country of birth came in August 2003 when he was called up to Thomas Rongen's U.S. under 20s squad, and traveled to Spain for the L'Alcudia International Tournament, where he started three of the five matches played. He was also named in Rongen's side for the 2003 World Youth Championships in December. He started every match and scored his first goal for the U.S. to help the squad reach the Quarter Finals. His play led to his inclusion with the mostly Major League Soccer based side that unsuccessfully tried to qualify the U.S. for 2004 Summer Olympics. He was only able to play in one match for Glenn Myernick due to an injury he suffered during training. He played for the United States under 20s team in the 2003 FIFA World Youth Championship, and has since been promoted to the under 23 squad.

On March 16, 2011, Whitbread was called into the United States senior team's camp for its friendlies against Argentina and Paraguay, but was unable to feature due to sustaining an injury while on club duty.

References

External links
 LFChistory.net player profile
 

1984 births
Living people
American soccer players
American expatriate soccer players
American people of English descent
English footballers
American expatriates in Singapore
Soccer players from Houston
Association football defenders
Liverpool F.C. players
Millwall F.C. players
Norwich City F.C. players
Leicester City F.C. players
Derby County F.C. players
Shrewsbury Town F.C. players
Premier League players
English Football League players
United States men's under-20 international soccer players
Sportspeople from Runcorn
People educated at a United World College